The third season of Family Guy first aired on the Fox network in 22 episodes from July 11, 2001, to November 9, 2003, before being released as a DVD box set and in syndication. It premiered with the episode "The Thin White Line" and finished with "Family Guy Viewer Mail #1". An episode that was not part of the season's original broadcast run, "When You Wish Upon a Weinstein", was included on the DVD release and later shown on both Adult Swim and Fox. The third season of Family Guy continues the adventures of the dysfunctional Griffin family—father Peter, mother Lois, daughter Meg, son Chris, baby Stewie and Brian, the family dog, who reside in their hometown of Quahog.

The executive producers for the third production season were Dan Palladino and series creator Seth MacFarlane. The aired season also contained nine episodes which were holdovers from season two, which were produced by MacFarlane and David Zuckerman.

Although Family Guy was initially canceled in 2000 due to low ratings, following a last-minute reprieve, the series returned for a third season in 2001. The series was canceled again in 2002; however, high ratings on Adult Swim and high DVD sales renewed Fox's interest in the series. The series returned for a total of 30 new episodes in 2005.

The episode "Brian Wallows and Peter's Swallows" won an Emmy Award for Best Song. Creator MacFarlane, the recipient of the award, noted that the episode's director Dan Povenmire deserved to have received the award for the contribution the visuals made to the episode's win. Povenmire responded humorously, "That's a nice sentiment and all, but did he offer to give me his? No! And it's not like he doesn't already have two of his own just sitting in his house!"

Production

Family Guy was first canceled in 2000 following the series' second season, but following a last-minute reprieve, it returned for a third season in 2001. In 2002, the series was canceled again after three seasons due to low ratings.
Fox attempted to sell the rights for reruns of the show, but it was difficult to find networks that were interested; Cartoon Network eventually bought the rights, " basically for free", according to the president of 20th Century Fox Television Production.

When the reruns were shown on Cartoon Network's Adult Swim in 2003, Family Guy became Adult Swim's most-watched show with an average 1.9 million viewers an episode. Following Family Guys high ratings on Adult Swim, the first two seasons were released on DVD in April 2003. Sales of the DVD set reached 2.2 million copies, becoming the best-selling television DVD of 2003 and the second highest-selling television DVD ever, behind the first season of Comedy Central's Chappelle's Show. The third season DVD release also sold more than a million copies. The show's popularity in both DVD sales and reruns rekindled Fox's interest in it. They ordered 35 new episodes in 2004, marking the first revival of a television show based on DVD sales. Fox president Gail Berman said that it was one of her most difficult decisions to cancel the show, and was therefore happy it would return. The network also began production of a film based on the series.

Dan Povenmire, who became a director on Family Guy during the series' second season, took a more prominent role in directing by the third season, having directed five episodes. Creator Seth MacFarlane granted Povenmire substantial creative freedom. Povenmire recalled that MacFarlane would tell him "We've got two minutes to fill. Give me some visual gags. Do whatever you want. I trust you." Povenmire praised this management style for letting him "have [...] fun." Povenmire brought realism, and material from his own experiences, to the visual direction of Family Guy. For "One If by Clam, Two If by Sea", several characters carried out fosse moves in prison — Povenmire went into the office of a color artist, Cynthia Macintosh, who had been a professional dancer, and had her strike poses in order for him to better illustrate the sequence. In the episode "To Love and Die in Dixie" Povenmire drew on his childhood in the deep south to sequence a background scene where the "redneck" character nonchalantly kicks a corpse into the nearby river.

Episodes

Reception
The episode "Brian Wallows and Peter's Swallows" won an Emmy Award for Best Song. Creator MacFarlane, the recipient of the award, noted that the episode's director Dan Povenmire deserved to have received the award for the contribution the visuals made to the episode's win. Povenmire jokingly responded "That's a nice sentiment and all, but did he offer to give me his? No! And it's not like he doesn't already have two of his own just sitting in his house!"

The third season has received positive reviews from critics. In his review for the Family Guy Volume 2 DVD, Aaron Beierle of DVD Talk stated "Often brilliant, extremely witty and darkly hilarious, Family Guy was unfortunately cancelled after Fox bumped it around six or seven different time slots. Although this third season wasn't as consistent as the first two, it's still hilarious and fans of the show should definitely pick up this terrific set."

References
Specific

General

External links

 
Family Guy seasons
2001 American television seasons
2002 American television seasons
2003 American television seasons